The name Edith has been used for seven tropical cyclones worldwide.

Atlantic
 Hurricane Edith (1955) – remained over open waters.
 Tropical Storm Edith (1959) – moved through the Lesser Antilles before dissipating south of Hispaniola.
 Hurricane Edith (1963) – caused 10 deaths in Martinique and moderate damage along its path through the northeastern Caribbean.
 Tropical Storm Edith (1967)- moved through the Lesser Antilles before dissipating to the south of Puerto Rico.
 Hurricane Edith (1971) – struck Cape Gracias a Dios as a Category 5 hurricane where it caused 30 deaths; later made landfall on Louisiana and caused $25 million in damage (1971 USD) in the United States.

Southwest Indian Ocean
 Cyclone Edith (1971) – struck Madagascar.

Australia Region
 Cyclone Edith (1967) – remained over open waters.

Atlantic hurricane set index articles
South-West Indian Ocean cyclone set index articles
Australian region cyclone set index articles